Shinil High School is a secondary school in Seoul,  South Korea. It was founded in 1966, and has been designated as an autonomous private school by the Ministry of Education since 2009.

References

External links
 Official site
 Website for alumni

High schools in South Korea
Education in Seoul
Educational institutions established in 1966
Boys' schools in South Korea